The Kabul River railway station is a Pakistan Railways train station in northwestern Pakistan.

It is located on the Kabul River in the city of Nowshera, in the Nowshera District of Khyber Pakhtunkhwa.

It formerly served the Great Indian Peninsula Railway.

See also
 List of railway stations in Pakistan
 Pakistan Railways

References

External links

Railway stations in Nowshera District
Kabul River